Israel Kaʻanoʻi Kamakawiwoʻole (meaning 'the fearless eye, the bold face'; May 20, 1959June 26, 1997), also called Bruddah Iz or just simply IZ, was a Hawaiian musician, singer, songwriter, and Hawaiian sovereignty activist.

He achieved commercial success outside Hawaii when his album Facing Future was released in 1993. His medley of "Somewhere Over the Rainbow/What a Wonderful World" was released on his albums Ka ʻAnoʻi and Facing Future, and was subsequently featured in several films, television programs, and television commercials. The song has had 358 weeks on top of the World Digital Songs chart, making it the longest-leading number-one hit on any of the Billboard song charts.

Along with his ukulele playing and incorporation of other genres, such as jazz and reggae, Kamakawiwoʻole remains influential in Hawaiian music, and is seen by many as the greatest Hawaiian musician of all time. He was named "The Voice of Hawai‘i" by NPR in 2010.

Early life 
Kamakawiwoʻole was born at Kuakini Medical Center in Honolulu to Henry "Hank" Kaleialoha Naniwa Kamakawiwoʻole Jr. and Evangeline "Angie" Leinani Kamakawiwoʻole. His parents both worked at a popular Waikiki nightclub, his mother the manager, his father a bouncer; his father was also driver of a sanitation truck at the U.S. Navy shipyard at Pearl Harbor. The notable Hawaiian musician Moe Keale was his uncle and a major musical influence. Kamakawiwoʻole was raised in the community of Kaimuki, where his parents had met and married.

He began playing music with his older brother Henry Kaleialoha Naniwa Kamakawiwoʻole III ("Skippy") and cousin Allen Thornton at the age of 11, being exposed to the music of Hawaiian entertainers of the time such as Peter Moon, Palani Vaughan, Keola Beamer and Don Ho, who frequented the establishment where Kamakawiwoʻole's parents worked. Hawaiian musician Del Beazley spoke of the first time he heard Kamakawiwoʻole perform, when, while playing for a graduation party, the whole room fell silent on hearing him sing. He remained in Hawaii as his brother Skippy entered the Army in 1971 and his cousin Allen moved to the mainland in 1976.

In his early teens, he studied at Upward Bound (UB) of the University of Hawaii at Hilo and his family moved to Mākaha. There he met Louis Kauakahi, Sam Gray, and Jerome Koko. Together with Skippy, they formed the Makaha Sons of Niʻihau. A part of the Hawaiian Renaissance, the band's blend of contemporary and traditional styles gained in popularity as they toured Hawaii and the mainland United States, releasing fifteen successful albums. Kamakawiwoʻole's aim was to make music that stayed true to the typical sound of traditional Hawaiian music. His cousin Bill Keale is also a musician.

Music career 
The Makaha Sons of Niʻihau recorded No Kristo in 1976 and released several more albums, including Hoʻoluana, Kahea O Keale, Keala, Makaha Sons of Niʻihau and Mahalo Ke Akua.

The group became Hawaii's most popular contemporary traditional group with breakout albums 1984's Puana Hou Me Ke Aloha and its follow-up, 1986's Hoʻola. Kamakawiwoʻole's last recorded album with the group was 1991's Hoʻoluana. It remains the group's top-selling CD. In 1982, Skippy died at age 28 of a heart attack. Later the same year, Kamakawiwoʻole married his childhood sweetheart Marlene. Soon after, they had a daughter whom they named Ceslie-Ann "Wehi" Kamakawiwoʻole (born ).

In 1990, Kamakawiwoʻole released his first solo album Ka ʻAnoʻi, which won awards for Contemporary Album of the Year and Male Vocalist of the Year from the Hawaiʻi Academy of Recording Arts (HARA). Facing Future was released in 1993 by The Mountain Apple Company. It featured a version of his most popular song, the medley "Somewhere Over the Rainbow/What a Wonderful World" (listed as "Over the Rainbow/What a Wonderful World"), along with "Hawaiʻi '78", "White Sandy Beach", "Maui Hawaiian Sup'pa Man", and "Kaulana Kawaihae". The decision to include a cover of "Somewhere Over the Rainbow" was said to be a last-minute one by his producer Jon de Mello and Kamakawiwoʻole. Facing Future debuted at No.25 on Billboard magazine's Top Pop Catalogue chart. On October 26, 2005, Facing Future became Hawaiʻi's first certified platinum album, selling more than a million CDs in the United States, according to the Recording Industry Association of America. On July 21, 2006, BBC Radio 1 announced that "Somewhere Over the Rainbow/What a Wonderful World (True Dreams)" would be released as a single in America.

In 1994, Kamakawiwoʻole was voted favorite entertainer of the year by the Hawaiʻi Academy of Recording Arts (HARA). E Ala E (1995) featured the political title song "ʻE Ala ʻE" and "Kaleohano", and N Dis Life (1996) featured "In This Life" and "Starting All Over Again".

In 1997, Kamakawiwoʻole was again honored by HARA at the Annual Nā Hōkū Hanohano awards for Male Vocalist of the Year, Favorite Entertainer of the Year, Album of the Year, and Island Contemporary Album of the Year. He watched the awards ceremony from a hospital room.

The posthumously released album Alone in Iz World (2001) debuted at No.1 on Billboard World Chart and No.135 on Billboard Top200, No.13 on the Top Independent Albums Chart, and No.15 on the Top Internet Album Sales charts.

His album Facing Future is the best-selling album by a Hawaiian artist in history.

Support of Hawaiian rights 
Kamakawiwoʻole was known for promoting Hawaiian rights and Hawaiian independence, both through his lyrics, which often stated the case for independence directly and through his own actions. For example, the lyric in his song "Hawaiʻi '78": "The life of this land is the life of the people/and that to care for the land (malama ʻāina) is to care for the Hawaiian culture", is a statement that many consider summarizing his Hawaiian ideals. The state motto of Hawaiʻi is a recurring line in the song and encompasses the meaning of his message: "Ua Mau ke Ea o ka ʻĀina i ka Pono" (proclaimed by King Kamehameha III when Hawaiʻi regained sovereignty in 1843. It can be roughly translated as: "The life of the land is perpetuated in righteousness").

Kamakawiwoʻole used his music to promote awareness of his belief that a second-class status had been pushed onto fellow natives by the tourism industry.

Later life 
In the 1990s, Kamakawiwoʻole became a born-again Christian. In 1996, he was baptized at the Word of Life Christian Center in Honolulu and spoke publicly about his beliefs at the Na Hoku Hanohano Awards. He also recorded the song "Ke Alo O Iesu".

Death 
He endured several hospitalizations because of his weight. With chronic medical problems including respiratory and cardiac issues, he died at the age of 38 in the Queen's Medical Center at 12:18am on June 26, 1997, from respiratory failure.

On July 10, 1997, the Hawaiian flag flew at half-staff for Kamakawiwoʻole's funeral. His koa wood casket lay at the state capitol building in Honolulu, making him the third person (and the only non-government official) to be so honored. Approximately 10,000 people attended his funeral. Thousands of fans gathered as his ashes were scattered into the Pacific Ocean at Mākua Beach on July 12, 1997. According to witnesses, many people commemorated him by honking their car and truck horns on all Hawaiian highways that day. Scenes from the funeral and scattering of Kamakawiwoʻole's ashes were featured in official music videos of "Over the Rainbow", released posthumously by Mountain Apple Company. , the two official video uploads of the song, as featured on YouTube by Mountain Apple Company Inc, have collectively received over 1.259 billion views.

On September 20, 2003, hundreds paid tribute to Kamakawiwoʻole as a bronze bust of him was unveiled at the Waianae Neighborhood Community Center on Oʻahu. His widow, Marlene Kamakawiwoʻole, and sculptor Jan-Michelle Sawyer were present for the dedication ceremony.

Legacy 
On December 6, 2010, NPR named Kamakawiwoʻole as "The Voice of Hawaii" in its 50 great voices series.

On March 24, 2011, Kamakawiwoʻole was honored with the German national music award Echo. The music managers Wolfgang Boss and Jon de Mello accepted the trophy in his stead.

A 2014 Pixar short film, Lava, features two volcanoes as the main characters. Kamakawiwoʻole's cover of "Somewhere Over the Rainbow" and his style of music was James Ford Murphy's partial inspiration for the short film.

On May 20, 2020, Google Doodle published a page in celebration of Kamakawiwoʻole's 61st birthday. It featured information about his life, musical career, and impact on Hawaii. Included was a two-minute cartoon video with Kamakawiwoʻole's cover of "Somewhere Over the Rainbow" playing as the background and imagery of Hawaii. The section of the page explaining the inspiration of the Doodle says that "The Doodle is full of places in Hawaiʻi that had special significance for Israel: the sunrise at Diamond Head, Mākaha Beach, the Palehua vista, the flowing lava and volcanic landscape of the Big Island, the black sand beach at Kalapana and the Waiʻanae coast."

"Somewhere Over the Rainbow/What a Wonderful World" 

Kamakawiwoʻole's recording of "Somewhere Over the Rainbow/What a Wonderful World" gained notice in 1999 when an excerpt was used in the TV commercials for eToys.com (later part of Toys "R" Us). The full song was featured in the movies K-Pax, Meet Joe Black, Finding Forrester, Son of the Mask, 50 First Dates, Fred Claus, Letters to Santa and IMAX: Hubble 3D. It was also featured in TV series ER, Between The Lions, Scrubs, Cold Case, Glee, South Pacific, Lost, Storm Chasers, the UK original version of Life on Mars, and in Modern Family, among others.

In 1988, a friend of Kamakawiwoʻole called a Honolulu recording studio owned by Milan Bertosa at 3:00 am with a request that Kamakawiwoʻole be allowed to come in to make a recording. Bertosa was about to shut down, but told the friend that Kamakawiwoʻole could come if he was able to make it within 15 minutes. In a 2011 interview, Bertosa recalled, "In walks the largest human being I had seen in my life. Israel was probably like 500 pounds. And the first thing at hand is to find something for him to sit on." A security guard gave Kamakawiwoʻole a large steel chair. "Then I put up some microphones, do a quick sound check, roll tape, and the first thing he does is 'Somewhere Over the Rainbow.' He played and sang, one take, and it was over." Five years later, Bertosa was working as an engineer at Mountain Apple Company when Iz was making a solo album there. Bertosa remembered the old demo tape and introduced it to de Mello who remarked "Israel was really sparkly, really alive." The original 1988 acoustic version of the song was released with the 1993 Facing Future album.

"Somewhere Over the Rainbow/What a Wonderful World" reached No.12 on Billboard's Hot Digital Tracks chart the week of January 31, 2004 (for the survey week ending January 18, 2004). It passed the two million paid-downloads mark in the US by September 27, 2009, and then sold three million in the US as of October 2, 2011. And as of October 2014, the song has sold more than 4.2 million digital copies. The song is the longest-leading number-one hit on any of the Billboard song charts, having spent 358 weeks on top of the World Digital Songs chart.

On July 8, 2007, Kamakawiwoʻole debuted at No.44 on the Billboard Top200 Album Chart with "Wonderful World", selling 17,000 units.

In April 2007, "Over the Rainbow" entered the UK charts at No.68, and eventually climbed to No.46, spending ten weeks in the Top100 over a two-year period.

In October 2010, following its use in a trailer for the TV channel VOX and on a TV advertisementfor Axe deodorant (which is itself a revival of the advertisement originally aired in 2004)it hit No.1 on the German singles chart, was the number-one seller single of 2010 and was eventually certified 2× Platinum in 2011.

As of November 1, 2010, "Over the Rainbow" peaked at No.6 on the OE3 Austria charts, which largely reflect airplay on Austria's government-operated Top40 radio network. It also peaked at No.1 in France and Switzerland in late December 2010.

On October 24, 2016, The Healer premiered at the Heartland Film Festival in Indianapolis, which featured "Over the Rainbow".

On December 21, 2020, the official music video for "Over the Rainbow" reached a billion views on YouTube.

In the Comedy Central comedy series Awkwafina Is Nora from Queens, the titular character and her father share an affinity for Kamakawiwoʻole.

Radio host George Noory uses "Over the Rainbow/What a Wonderful World" as bumper music on the overnight talk radio show Coast to Coast AM.

In 2021, the song was inducted into the National Recording Registry as part of the heritage in American recorded sound.

Discography

Studio albums 
Ka ʻAnoʻi (1990)
Facing Future (1993)
E Ala E (1995)
N Dis Life (1996)

Compilation albums 
IZ in Concert: The Man and His Music (1998)
Alone in IZ World (2001)
Wonderful World (2007)
Somewhere Over the Rainbow: The Best of Israel Kamakawiwoʻole (2011)

References

Sources

External links 

1959 births
1997 deaths
20th-century American male singers
20th-century American singers
American Christians
American male songwriters
Burials at sea
Christians from Hawaii
Converts to Christianity
Deaths from respiratory failure
Hawaiian ukulele players
Mountain Apple Company artists
Musicians from Honolulu
Na Hoku Hanohano Award winners
Native Hawaiian musicians
Native Hawaiian nationalists
Respiratory disease deaths in Hawaii
Singers from Hawaii
Songwriters from Hawaii